Menpehtyre Ramesses I (or Ramses) was the founding pharaoh of ancient Egypt's 19th Dynasty. The dates for his short reign are not completely known but the time-line of late 1292–1290 BC is frequently cited as well as 1295–1294 BC. While Ramesses I was the founder of the 19th Dynasty, his brief reign mainly serves to mark the transition between the reign of Horemheb, who had stabilized Egypt in the late 18th Dynasty, and the rule of the powerful pharaohs of his own dynasty, in particular his son Seti I, and grandson Ramesses II.

Origins

Originally called Pa-ra-mes-su, Ramesses I was of non-royal birth, being born into a noble military family from the Nile Delta region, perhaps near the former Hyksos capital of Avaris. He was a son of a troop commander called Seti. His uncle Khaemwaset, an army officer, married Tamwadjesy, the matron of Tutankhamun's Harem of Amun, who was a relative of Huy, the viceroy of Kush, an important state post. This shows the high status of Ramesses' family. Ramesses I found favor with Horemheb, the last pharaoh of the tumultuous Eighteenth Dynasty, who appointed the former as his vizier. Ramesses also served as the High Priest of Set  – as such, he would have played an important role in the restoration of the old religion following the Amarna heresy of a generation earlier, under Akhenaten.

Horemheb himself had been a nobleman from outside the immediate royal family, who rose through the ranks of the Egyptian army to serve as the royal advisor to Tutankhamun and Ay and, ultimately, pharaoh. Since Horemheb had no surviving children, he ultimately chose Ramesses to be his heir in the final years of his reign presumably because Ramesses I was both an able administrator and had a son (Seti I) and a grandson (the future Ramesses II) to succeed him and thus avoid any succession difficulties.

Upon his accession, Ramesses assumed a prenomen, or royal name. When transliterated, the name is mn-pḥty-rʿ, which is usually interpreted as Menpehtyre, meaning "Established by the strength of Ra". However, he is better known by his nomen, or personal name. This is transliterated as rʿ-ms-sw, and is usually realised as Ramessu or Ramesses, meaning 'Ra bore him'. Already an old man when he was crowned, Ramesses appointed his son, the later pharaoh Seti I, to serve as the Crown Prince and chosen successor. Seti was charged with undertaking several military operations during this time–in particular, an attempt to recoup some of Egypt's lost possessions in Syria. Ramesses appears to have taken charge of domestic matters: most memorably, he completed the second pylon at Karnak Temple, begun under Horemheb.

Death

Ramesses I enjoyed a very brief reign, as evidenced by the general paucity of contemporary monuments mentioning him: the king had little time to build any major buildings in his reign and was hurriedly buried in a small and hastily finished tomb. The Egyptian priest Manetho assigns him a reign of 16 months, but this pharaoh certainly ruled Egypt for a minimum of 17 months based on his highest known date which is a Year 2 II Peret day 20 (Louvre C57) stela which ordered the provision of new endowments of food and priests for the temple of Ptah within the Egyptian fortress of Buhen. Jürgen von Beckerath observes that Ramesses I died just 5 months later—in June 1290 BC—since his son Seti I succeeded to power on III Shemu day 24. Ramesses I's only known action was to order the provision of endowments for the aforementioned Nubian temple at Buhen and "the construction of a chapel and a temple (which was to be finished by his son) at Abydos." The aged Ramesses was buried in the Valley of the Kings. His tomb, discovered by Giovanni Belzoni in 1817 and designated KV16, is small in size and gives the impression of having been completed with haste. Joyce Tyldesley states that Ramesses I's tomb consisted of a single corridor and one unfinished room whose walls, after a hurried coat of plaster, were painted to show the king with his gods, with Osiris allowed a prominent position. The red granite sarcophagus too was painted rather than carved with inscriptions which, due to their hasty preparation, included a number of unfortunate errors.

Seti I, his son and successor, later built a small chapel with fine reliefs in memory of his deceased father Ramesses I at Abydos. In 1911, John Pierpont Morgan donated several exquisite reliefs from this chapel to the Metropolitan Museum of Art in New York.

Rediscovery and repatriation

A mummy currently believed to be that of Ramesses I was stolen from Egypt and displayed in a private Canadian museum for many years before being repatriated.  The mummy's identity cannot be conclusively determined, but is most likely to be that of Ramesses I based on CT scans, X-rays, skull measurements and radio-carbon dating tests by researchers at Emory University, as well as aesthetic interpretations of family resemblance. Moreover, the mummy's arms were found crossed high across his chest which was a position reserved solely for Egyptian royalty until 600 BC.

The mummy had been stolen from the Royal Cache in Deir el-Bahari by the Abu-Rassul family of grave robbers and sold by Turkish vice-consular agent Mustapha Aga Ayat at Luxor to Dr. James Douglas who brought it to North America around 1860. Douglas used to purchase Egyptian antiquities for his friend Sydney Barnett who then placed it in the Niagara Museum and Daredevil Hall of Fame in Niagara Falls Ontario, Canada. The mummy remained there, its identity unknown, next to other curiosities and so-called freaks of nature for more than 130 years. When the owner of the museum decided to sell his property, Canadian businessman William Jamieson purchased the contents of the museum and, with the help of Canadian Egyptologist Gayle Gibson, identified their great value. In 1999, Jamieson sold the Egyptian artifacts in the collection, including the various mummies, to the Michael C. Carlos Museum at Emory University in Atlanta, Georgia for US $2 million. The mummy was returned to Egypt on October 24, 2003 with full official honors and is on display at the Luxor Museum.

References

Bibliography

External links
Ramesses I: The search for the Lost Pharaoh

 
13th-century BC Pharaohs
Pharaohs of the Nineteenth Dynasty of Egypt
Viziers of the Eighteenth Dynasty of Egypt
Year of birth unknown
1290s BC deaths
Ancient Egyptian mummies
Art and cultural repatriation